Lois Irene Smith (8 October 1929 – 22 January 2011) was a Canadian ballet dancer and dance teacher. Smith was born in Vancouver in 1929. She began her dance training at the British Columbia School of Ballet, and later studied with Rosemary Deveson and Mara McBirney in Vancouver. She married fellow dancer David Adams (1928–2007) in 1950. The couple had one daughter, Janine, and separated during the 1960s.

In 1951, she joined the National Ballet of Canada as the company's initial prima ballerina. Following an injury, she left the National Ballet to form her own dance school in 1969.

She was appointed an Officer of the Order of Canada on 23 June 1980 and invested in October 1980.

Smith died at Sechelt, British Columbia in 2011, aged 81, from a deteriorating illness. She had one daughter, Janine, with Adams.

References

External links
 Lois Smith at The Canadian Encyclopedia
Archive footage of Lois Smith performing Lilac Garden with National Ballet of Canada in 1953 at Jacob's Pillow
Lois Smith fonds (R8912) at Library and Archives Canada. The fonds consists of amateur and professionally shot footage of performances, rehearsals and classes of the National Ballet of Canada in which Smith appears.

1929 births
2011 deaths
Canadian ballerinas
Canadian female dancers
National Ballet of Canada principal dancers
Officers of the Order of Canada
People from Vancouver